This is a list of town tramway systems in Finland. It includes all tram systems in Finland, past and present; cities with currently operating systems, and those systems themselves, are indicated in bold and blue background colored rows. The use of the diamond (♦) symbol indicates where there were (or are) two or more independent tram systems operating concurrently within a single metropolitan area.  Those tram systems that operated on other than standard gauge track (where known) are indicated in the 'Notes' column.

, the Tampere light rail is in service and two systems are under construction: Jokeri light rail and the Crown Bridges.

In addition, further research is being conducted on Turku light rail.

There are also early-stage plans of a new tramway in the city of Vantaa.

Note: The city of Tampere formerly operated a trolleybus system (1948–1976). The city of Helsinki also had a one-line trolleybus system (1949-74 and 1979-85) in addition to trams.

See also
 Trams in Finland
 List of town tramway systems in Europe
 List of tram and light rail transit systems
 List of metro systems

References

Bibliography
 Books, Periodicals and External Links

 
Tram
Finland